The New Zealand national cricket team represents New Zealand in men's international cricket. Named the Black Caps, they played their first Test in 1930 against England in Christchurch, becoming the fifth country to play Test cricket. From 1930 New Zealand had to wait until 1956, more than 26 years, for its first Test victory, against the West Indies at Eden Park in Auckland. They played their first ODI in the 1972–73 season against Pakistan in Christchurch.

Kane Williamson is the current captain of the team in T20I's, Tim Southee is the current test captain as Kane Williamson stepped down as captain in December 2022. The national team is organized by New Zealand Cricket.

The New Zealand cricket team became known as the Blackcaps in January 1998, after its sponsor at the time, Clear Communications, held a competition to choose a name for the team. This is one of many national team nicknames related to the All Blacks.

As of 25 November 2022, New Zealand have played 1429 international matches, out of which they have won 566, lost 635, tied 16 and drew 168 matches while 44 matches ended up as no result.
The team is ranked 5th in Tests, 1st in ODIs and 5th in T20Is by the ICC.

As of 2022, the team has participated in all the 29 ICC Men's events taking place from 1975 onwards and have made six final appearances out of which they won two titles. In October 2000 they won the Knockout Trophy by defeating India which was their maiden ICC Title. They defeated South Africa to reach their maiden CWC Final in 2015. In the next edition they reached their second successive Final by defeating India. Then in June 2021 they won the inaugural WTC by defeating India and five months later they reached their maiden T20 WC Final by defeating England.

History

Beginnings of cricket in New Zealand

The reverend Henry Williams provided history with the first report of a game of cricket in New Zealand, when he wrote in his diary in December 1832 about boys in and around Paihia on Horotutu Beach playing cricket. In 1835, Charles Darwin and  called into the Bay of Islands on its epic circumnavigation of the Earth and Darwin witnessed a game of cricket played by freed Māori slaves and the son of a missionary at Waimate North. Darwin in The Voyage of the Beagle wrote:

several young men redeemed by the missionaries from slavery were employed on the farm. In the evening I saw a party of them at cricket.

The first recorded game of cricket in New Zealand took place in Wellington in December 1842. The Wellington Spectator reports a game on 28 December 1842 played by a "Red" team and a "Blue" team from the Wellington Club. The first fully recorded match was reported by the Examiner in Nelson between the Surveyors and Nelson in March 1844.

The first team to tour New Zealand was Parr's all England XI in 1863–64. Between 1864 and 1914, 22 foreign teams toured New Zealand. England sent 6 teams, Australia 15 and one from Fiji.

First national team

On 15–17 February 1894 the first team representing New Zealand played New South Wales at Lancaster Park in Christchurch. New South Wales won by 160 runs. New South Wales returned again in 1895–96 and New Zealand won the solitary game by 142 runs, its first victory. The New Zealand Cricket Council was formed towards the end of 1894.

New Zealand played its first two internationals (not Tests) in 1904–05 against a star-studded Australia team containing such players as Victor Trumper, Warwick Armstrong and Clem Hill. Rain saved New Zealand from a thrashing in the first match, but not the second, which New Zealand lost by an innings and 358 runs – currently the second-largest defeat in New Zealand first-class history.

Inter-war period

In 1927 NZ toured England. They played 26 first-class matches, mostly against county sides. They won seven matches, including those against Worcestershire, Glamorgan, Somerset and Derbyshire. On the strength of the performances of this tour New Zealand was granted Test status.

In 1929/30 the M.C.C toured NZ and played 4 Tests all of 3 days in duration. New Zealand lost its first Test match but drew the next 3. In the second Test Stewie Dempster and Jackie Mills put on 276 for the first wicket. This is still the highest partnership for New Zealand against England. New Zealand first played South Africa in 1931–32 in a three match series but were unable to secure Test matches against any teams other than England before World War II ended all Test cricket for 7 years. A Test tour by Australia, planned for February and March 1940, was cancelled after the outbreak of the war.

After World War II

New Zealand's first Test after the war was against Australia in 1945/46. This game was not considered a "Test" at the time but it was granted Test status retrospectively by the International Cricket Council in March 1948. The New Zealand players who appeared in this match probably did not appreciate this move by the ICC as New Zealand were dismissed for 42 and 54. The New Zealand Cricket Council's unwillingness to pay Australian players a decent allowance to tour New Zealand ensured that this was the only Test Australia played against New Zealand between 1929 and 1972.

In 1949 New Zealand sent one of its best-ever sides to England. It contained Bert Sutcliffe, Martin Donnelly, John R. Reid and Jack Cowie. However, 3-day Test matches ensured that all 4 Tests were drawn. Many have regarded the 1949 tour of England among New Zealand's best ever touring performances. All four tests were high-scoring despite being draws and Martin Donnelly's 206 at Lord's hailed as one of the finest innings ever seen there. Despite being winless, New Zealand did not lose a test either. Prior to this, only the legendary 1948 Australian team, led by the great Don Bradman, had achieved this.

New Zealand played its first matches against the West Indies in 1951–52, and Pakistan and India in 1955/56.

In 1954/55 New Zealand recorded the lowest ever innings total, 26 against England. The following season New Zealand achieved its first Test victory. The first 3 Tests of a 4 Test series were won easily by the West Indies but New Zealand won the fourth to notch up its first Test victory. It had taken them 45 matches and 26 years to attain.

In the next 20 years, New Zealand won only seven more Tests. For most of this period New Zealand lacked a class bowler to lead their attack although they had two excellent batsmen in Bert Sutcliffe and Glenn Turner and a great all-rounder in John R. Reid.

Reid captained New Zealand on a tour to South Africa in 1961–62 where the five-test series was drawn 2–2. The victories in the third and fifth tests were the first overseas victories New Zealand achieved. Reid scored 1,915 runs in the tour, setting a record for the most runs scored by a touring batsman of South Africa as a result.

New Zealand won their first test series in their three match 1969/70 tour of Pakistan 1–0. This was the first ever series win by New Zealand after almost 40 years and 30 consecutive winless series.

1970 to 2000

In 1973 Richard Hadlee debuted and the rate at which New Zealand won Tests picked up dramatically. Hadlee was one of the best pace bowlers of his generation, playing 86 Tests for New Zealand before he retired in 1990. Of the 86 Tests that Hadlee played in New Zealand won 22 and lost 28. In 1977/78 New Zealand won its first Test against England, at the 48th attempt. Hadlee took 10 wickets in the match.

During the 1980s New Zealand also had the services of one of its best-ever batsman, Martin Crowe and a number of good players such as John Wright, Bruce Edgar, John F. Reid, Andrew Jones, Geoff Howarth, Jeremy Coney, Ian Smith, John Bracewell, Lance Cairns, Stephen Boock, and Ewen Chatfield, who were capable of playing the occasional match-winning performance and consistently making a valuable contribution to a Test match.

The best example of New Zealand's two star players (R. Hadlee and M. Crowe) putting in match-winning performances and other players making good contributions is New Zealand versus Australia, 1985 at Brisbane. In Australia's first innings Hadlee took 9–52. In New Zealand's only innings, M Crowe scored 188 and John F. Reid 108. Edgar, Wright, Coney, Jeff Crowe, V. Brown, and Hadlee scored between 17 and 54*. In Australia's second innings, Hadlee took 6–71 and Chatfield 3–75. New Zealand won by an innings and 41 runs.

One-day cricket also gave New Zealand a chance to compete more regularly than Test cricket with the better sides in world cricket. In one-day cricket a batsman does not need to score centuries to win games for his side and bowlers do not need to bowl the opposition out. One-day games can be won by one batsman getting a 50, a few others getting 30s, bowlers bowling economically and everyone fielding well. These were requirements New Zealand players could consistently meet and thus developed a good one-day record against all sides.

Perhaps New Zealand's most infamous one-day match was the "under arm" match against Australia at the MCG in 1981. Requiring six runs to tie the match off the final ball, Australian captain Greg Chappell instructed his brother Trevor to bowl the ball underarm along the wicket to prevent New Zealand batsman Brian McKechnie from hitting a six. The Australian umpires ruled the move as legal even though to this day many believe it was one of the most unsporting decisions made in cricket.

When New Zealand next played in the tri-series in Australia in 1983, Lance Cairns became a cult hero for his one-day batting. In one match against Australia, he hit six sixes at the MCG, one of the world's largest grounds. Few fans remember that New Zealand lost this game by 149 runs. However, Lance's greatest contribution to New Zealand cricket was his son Chris Cairns.

Chris Cairns made his debut one year before Hadlee retired in 1990. Cairns, one of New Zealand's best all-rounders, led the 1990s bowling attack with Danny Morrison. Stephen Fleming, New Zealand's most prolific scorer, led the batting and the team into the 21st century. Nathan Astle and Craig McMillan also scored plenty of runs for New Zealand, but both retired earlier than expected.

Daniel Vettori made his debut as an 18-year-old in 1997, and when he took over from Fleming as captain in 2007 he was regarded as the best spinning all-rounder in world cricket. On 26 August 2009, Daniel Vettori became the eighth player and second left-arm bowler (after Chaminda Vaas) in history to take 300 wickets and score 3000 test runs, joining the illustrious club. Vettori decided to take an indefinite break from international short form cricket in 2011 but continued to represent New Zealand in Test cricket and returned for the 2015 Cricket World Cup.

On 4 April 1996, New Zealand achieved a unique world record, where the whole team was adjudged Man of the Match for team performance against 4-run victory over the West Indies. This is recorded as the only time where whole team achieved such an award.

21st century

New Zealand started the new millennium by winning the 2000 ICC KnockOut Trophy in Kenya to claim their first ICC tournament. This was a knockout tournament where teams were seeded according to their performance in Cricket World Cup 1999, the top five teams from that world cup gained direct entry to quarter-finals and while remaining six teams had to play the pre-quarter finals. New Zealand gained direct entry to quarter-finals where they faced Zimbabwe against whom they had recently lost an ODI series, after a nervy start they pulled things back and romped to a crushing 64-run victory to get through to the semis. In semis they faced Pakistan, a team who had managed to knock New Zealand out from last World Cup at this very stage. New Zealand beat Pakistan this time in a thrilling run-chase to enter the final. In the final, they faced India who had knocked out world champions Australia and defending champions South Africa. New Zealand won the toss and opted to bowl but the decision seemed to backfire as India romped to a 141 run opening partnership in 27 overs, New Zealand somehow managed to pull things back but the target was a daunting 265, and in reply they struggled for the most part of their innings but in the end, it was a 122-run partnership between Chris Cairns and Chris Harris that took them close the target before Cairns finished the game with two balls to spare as New Zealand won its first-ever ICC event.

Shane Bond played 18 Tests for NZ between 2001 and 2009 but missed far more through injury. When fit, he added a dimension to the NZ bowling attack that had been missing since Hadlee retired, taking 87 wickets at an average of 22.09.

The rise of the financial power of the BCCI had an immense effect on NZ cricket and its players. The BCCI managed to convince other boards not to pick players who had joined the rival Twenty-20 Indian Cricket League. NZ Cricket lost the services of Shane Bond, Lou Vincent, Andre Adams, Hamish Marshall and Daryl Tuffey. The money to be made from Twenty-20 cricket in India may have also induced players, such as Craig McMillan and Scott Styris (from Test cricket) to retire earlier than they would have otherwise. After the demise of the Indian Cricket League Bond and Tuffey again played for New Zealand.

Vettori stood down as Test captain in 2011 leading to star batsman Ross Taylor to take his place. Taylor led New Zealand for a year which included a thrilling win in a low scoring Test match against Australia in Hobart, their first win over Australia since 1993. In 2012/13 Brendon McCullum became captain and new players such as Kane Williamson, Corey Anderson, Doug Bracewell, Trent Boult and Jimmy Neesham emerged as world-class performers. McCullum captained New Zealand to series wins against the West Indies and India in 2013/14 and both Pakistan and Sri Lanka in 2014/15 increasing New Zealand's rankings in both Test and ODI formats. In the series against India McCullum scored 302 at Wellington to become New Zealand's first Test triple centurion.

In early 2015 New Zealand made the final of the Cricket World Cup, going through the tournament undefeated until the final, where they lost to Australia by seven wickets.

In 2015 the New Zealand national cricket team played under the name of Aotearoa for their first match against Zimbabwe to celebrate te Wiki o te Reo Māori (Māori Language Week).

In mid-2015 New Zealand toured England, performing well, drawing the Test series 1–1, and losing the One Day series, 2–3.

From October to November 2015, and in February 2016, New Zealand played Australia in two Test Series, in three and two games a piece

With a changing of an era in the Australian team, New Zealand was rated as a chance of winning especially in New Zealand.  New Zealand lost both series by 2-0

In February 2016, Kane Williamson was appointed as the captain of the team after Brendon McCullum's retirement after playing his 101st test against Australia at Christchurch. Williamson's first international series as the full-time captain was Men's T20 World Cup 2016 in India in which the team won all four of its group games but lost to England in the semi-final at Delhi. After the annual rankings update on 4 May 2016 the team was awarded the No. 1 ranking in T20Is. The team then got into a rough patch after the T20WC where they would go onto lose away series to South Africa, India and Australia. In their home season they managed to beat Pakistan for the first time in a test series after 32 years, whitewashed Bangladesh across formats, won the Chappell-Hadlee Trophy against Australia but went onto lose to South Africa in T20I, ODI and Test series.

New Zealand started the 2017 international season with a tri-series involving hosts Ireland, and Bangladesh as a preparation for upcoming Champions Trophy in England. New Zealand managed to win the tri-series as they finished at the top of the points table but the Champions Trophy turned out to be a disastrous campaign as they get knockout out by Bangladesh and ended the tournament without even a single win which was the worst performance for them in an ICC Event. After that the team had to wait four months for their next tour which was to India in which both the ODI and T20I series were closely contested but New Zealand lost both by a scoreline of 2–1. The home season started with whitewash of the West Indies across formats followed by whitewash of Pakistan in the ODI series but after that New Zealand lost the T20I series to Pakistan and in the process lost their No. 1 ranking in T20Is. Then they took part in the first ever T20I tri-series involving full-members the Trans-Tasman T20I Tri-Series in which they ended up runners-up to Australia and England finished third. Then they played England where they lost the ODI series but then managed to win the test series. This was their first test series win against England after 19 years and 4th overall in their 87 year old rivalry.

New Zealand didn't have any matches scheduled for 2018 season, so after a 7-month wait from their last series they toured UAE in Oct-Dec 2018 to play Pakistan, the tour started with New Zealand suffering whitewash in the T20I series but then managed to  win the first ODI which marked their 12th consecutive ODI win against Pakistan. The ODI series ended up as a one-a-piece draw. After that New Zealand produced a stunning act of resilience to register their first away test series win against Pakistan after 49 years. This put New Zealand 3rd on the test rankings table with No. 2 ranking in sight. After this in their home season they beat Sri Lanka across formats, lost to India in the ODI series before managing to beat them in the T20I series and lastly they beat Bangladesh across formats and they climbed to No. 2 spot in Test rankings as a consequence of test series win against them.

New Zealand started the 2019 season with the mega event, the Cricket World Cup in England & Wales. New Zealand had a terrific start to their World Cup campaign as they remained unbeaten and top of the table for their first six games. Their formed dipped after that initial burst as they managed to lose their next three group games convincingly and just managed to get through to the semis as the fourth placed team on net run-rate. They were tipped rank underdogs in their semi-final clash against table-toppers India, but managed to stun the favorites on the reserve day to enter their second consecutive final. The final ended up in heart-breaking manner as New Zealand missed out on the opportunity of lifting the World Cup for the first time by the barest of margins as they lost the match due to hitting fewer boundaries than England. This boundary countback rule was criticized by fans and media all over the world and a couple of months later ICC abolished this rule for future ICC events.

In December 2022, captain Kane Williamson stepped down as test captain with Tim Southee to replace him. Many people have said Tom Latham should have been named captained as he's already captained nine tests. Kane Williamson Will remains as the Blackcaps white-ball captain.

International grounds

Listed chronologically in order of first match. Neutral fixtures such as World Cup and World Cup Qualifier games are included.

Current squad
This is a list of players contracted directly by NZC or who has been named in recent Test, ODI or T20I squads. Contracted players are listed in bold. Uncapped players are listed in italics.

Ross Taylor and Colin de Grandhomme were contracted with NZC, but have since announced their retirement from international cricket.

Forms – refers to the forms of cricket are player has played in for New Zealand in the past year
No. – Shirt number

Coaching staff

Coaching history
1985–1987:  Glenn Turner
1990–1993:  Warren Lees
1993–1995:  Geoff Howarth
1995–1996:  Glenn Turner
1996–1999:  Steve Rixon
1999–2001: David Trist
2001–2003:  Denis Aberhart
2003–2008:  John Bracewell
2008–2009:  Andy Moles
2010:  Mark Greatbatch
2010–2012:  John Wright
2012–2018:  Mike Hesson
2018–present:  Gary Stead

Team colours

New Zealand's kit is manufactured by Canterbury of New Zealand, who replaced previous manufacturer WStar in 2009.
When playing Test cricket, New Zealand's cricket whites feature logo of the sponsors Gillette on the left of the shirt, the ANZ logo on the left sleeve and on the middle of the shirt and the Canterbury logo on the right sleeve. New Zealand fielders may wear a black cap (in the style of a baseball cap rather than the baggy cap worn by some teams) or a white sun hat with the New Zealand Cricket logo in the middle. Helmets are also coloured black (although until 1996, they used to be white with the silver fern logo encased in a black circle).

In limited overs cricket, New Zealand's ODI and Twenty20 shirts feature the ANZ logo across the centre, with the silver fern badge on the left of the shirt, Canterbury logo on the right sleeve and the Ford logo on the right. In ODIs, the kit comprises a black shirt with blue accents and black trousers, whilst the Twenty20 kit comprises a beige shirt with black accents and black trousers. In ICC limited-overs tournaments, a modified kit design is used with sponsor's logos moving to the sleeve and 'NEW ZEALAND' printed across the front.

In ODI, New Zealand wore Beige and brown between 1980 World Series Cricket and 1988 World Series Cricket. The 1983–1984 version was made popular by the Black Caps supporter group Beige Brigade, who sells the version of this uniform to the general public together with a "moral contract" which explains the expectations that come with being a Beige Brigadier. and was also worn in the inaugural Twenty20 international between New Zealand and Australia. Between 1991 and 1997 grey or silver (with some splashes of black or white) was worn instead. Until 2000, the ODI uniform was teal with black accents.

Previous suppliers were Adidas (World Series Cricket 1980–1990), ISC (World Cup World Cup 1992 and 1996, World Series 1993–97) Canterbury (1998–1999), Asics (who supplied all the 1999 Cricket World Cup participating teams) and WStar (2000–2009).

Previous sponsors were DB Draught (1990–1994 in the front, 1995–1997 in the sleeve), Bank of New Zealand (1993–94 and 1997–99 in the front), Clear Communications, later TelstraClear (1997–2000 in the front, 2001–2005 in the sleeve), National Bank of New Zealand (2000–2014) and Dheeraj and East Coast (2009–2010), since 2014 ANZ is the current sponsor, due to National Bank's rebranding as ANZ. Amul became the new sponsor in May 2017 for the ICC CT17.

Tournament history

ICC Cricket World Cup

ICC T20 World Cup

ICC World Test Championship

ICC Champions Trophy (ICC KnockOut)

Austral-Asia Cup

Commonwealth Games

Honours

ICC
World Test Championship:
 Champions (1): 2019–2021
World Cup:
 Runners-up (2): 2015, 2019
T20 World Cup:
 Runners-up (1): 2021
Champions Trophy:
 Champions (1): 2000
 Runners-up (1): 2009

Others
Commonwealth Games:
 Bronze medal (1): 1998

Result summary

Test matches

* Only bilateral series wherein a minimum of 2 matches were played have been included here. One-off matches are not credited as a bilateral series.

ODI matches

* Only bilateral series wherein a minimum of 2 matches were played have been included here. One-off matches are not credited as a bilateral series.

* "Tie+W" and "Tie+L" indicates matches tied and then won or lost in a tiebreaker such as a bowlout or one-over-eliminator ("Super Over").

* The win percentage excludes no results and counts ties (irrespective of a tiebreaker) as half a win.

* Forfeited matches are not included.

T20I matches

* Only bilateral series wherein a minimum of 2 matches were played have been included here. One-off matches are not credited as a bilateral series.

* "Tie+W" and "Tie+L" indicates matches tied and then won or lost in a tiebreaker such as a bowlout or one-over-eliminator ("Super Over")

* The win percentage excludes no results and counts ties (irrespective of a tiebreaker) as half a win.

Records

World records

 Richard Hadlee, one of New Zealand and the world's best all-rounders, took the world record for most Test wickets (374) vs India at Bangalore in 1988. Hadlee was the first bowler to reach 400 Test wickets, vs India at Christchurch in 1990, and finished his career with 431 wickets. He subsequently lost the record to Kapil Dev.
 The black caps would be known for their world record of having the most semi final appearances of any country but The Black Caps have yet to claim the trophy.
 Corey Anderson holds record for the second fastest century in One Day Internationals (or any other format of international cricket). Playing against West Indies, he scored his ton in just 36 balls. Corey Anderson lost the record to AB de Villiers when AB scored a century in just 31 balls against West Indies.
 In a One Day International in 1996, the entire New Zealand team were awarded man of the match against the West Indies, the first such occasion.
 Andrew Jones and Martin Crowe held the highest ever 3rd-wicket partnership in Tests, with 467 against Sri Lanka in 1991, which at the time was the highest partnership for any wicket.
 Brian Hastings and Richard Collinge together scored 151 runs for the 10th-wicket against Pakistan in 1973, the highest 10th-wicket partnership at the time.
 Nathan Astle scored Test cricket's fastest ever double century versus England, at Christchurch in 2002. He scored 200 off 153 balls with the second hundred coming off just 39 deliveries. He was eventually out for 222—the dreaded double Nelson. He knocked the first hundred off 114 balls. Astle smashed the record by 59 balls, previously held by Adam Gilchrist Australia vs South Africa Johannesburg 2002.
 Brendon McCullum holds the world record for the fastest Test hundred in terms of balls faced. It was scored off 54 balls on 20 February 2016, against Australia during his final Test match, in Christchurch.
 Brendon McCullum holds the world record for the most sixes in Test cricket with 107. He passed Adam Gilchrist's record of 100 in his final Test match. This record was also previously held by Chris Cairns.
 Brendon McCullum was the first batsman to score two centuries in Twenty20 International Cricket (116* v. Australia and 123 v. Bangladesh).
 Brendon McCullum held the record for the highest individual score in Twenty20 International cricket, when he scored 123 v. Bangladesh at Pallekele. He lost the record to Aaron Finch who scored 156* against England at Southampton.
 Chris Cairns and his father Lance Cairns are one of the two father-son combinations to each claim 100 Test wickets, South Africa's Peter and Shaun Pollock being the other.
 Martin Guptill scored the highest score in World Cups with 237* in 2015.
 Guptill holds the record for most career runs (2,271) and most sixes (103, equal with Chris Gayle) in Twenty20 Internationals, both records previously held by Brendon McCullum.
 John Bracewell was the first – and so far only – substitute fielder to take four catches in a One Day International, vs Australia in Adelaide on 23 November 1980. 
 Daniel Vettori was the first cricketer to take four wickets and score a half-century in each innings of a Test match, a feat he achieved against Bangladesh in October 2008 at Chittagong. His figures were 5/95 and 4/74 with the ball and 55* and 76 with the bat.
 Colin Munro is the first player in to score three Twenty20 International hundreds. This was accomplished on 3 January 2018 against the West Indies when he scored 104 off 88 balls, with 3 fours and 10 sixes.
 Ross Taylor is the first player to have played 100 ODI, Tests and T20Is.
 Chris Harris holds the record for the most ODI caught and bowled dismissals, with 29.

Notable
 Ross Taylor has the 8th highest ODI batting average among batsmen to have played at least 100 ODIs, and Kane Williamson has the 10th highest.
 New Zealand dismissed Zimbabwe (Harare 2005) twice in the same day for totals of 59 and 99. Zimbabwe became only the second team (after India at Manchester in 1952) to be dismissed twice in the same day. The whole Test was completed inside two days. This feat was then repeated at Napier in 2012 when NZ dismissed Zimbabwe for 51 and 143 to end the match within three days.
 Kane Williamson holds the record for most centuries by a New Zealander in Tests, with 24.
 Brendon McCullum holds the record for the highest Test innings by a New Zealander of 302 (vs India in 2014). He is currently the only triple centurion from New Zealand.
 Brendon McCullum holds the New Zealand Test record for the most innings of 200 or more, with 4.
 Brendon McCullum scored the fastest World Cup fifty (off 18 balls) for New Zealand in a Pool A Match of 2015 Cricket World Cup against England, beating his own 20-ball record set against Canada in World Cup (2007) earlier.
 Martin Guptill holds the record for the highest One Day International innings by a New Zealander, with 237 not out against West Indies in the 2015 World Cup Quarter-final in Wellington.
 Shane Bond took an ODI hat-trick in the last over (innings bowling figures: 10–0–61–4) vs Australia at Hobart in January 2007.
 Tim Southee took a Twenty20 hat-trick, taking 5–18 in the match against Pakistan.
 Colin Munro scored the second fastest T20 International 50, off 14 balls, against Sri Lanka at Eden Park, Auckland on 10 January 2016.
 Chris Harris, Daniel Vettori, Kyle Mills and Chris Cairns are the only New Zealand cricketers to have taken 200 wickets in ODIs.
 Chris Harris and Chris Cairns are the only two New Zealand cricketers to complete the 4000 run / 200 wicket double in ODIs. The others are Sri Lankan Sanath Jayasuriya, South African Jacques Kallis, Pakistani's Shahid Afridi and Abdul Razzaq and Bangladeshi Shakib Al Hasan).
 Ajaz Patel took all 10 wickets in an innings, being the third international cricketer and first New Zealand cricketer to achieve this feat, after England's Jim Laker and India's Anil Kumble .
 In June 2022 against England, New Zealand scored the fifth-highest team total (553) and second-highest match aggregate (837) in a losing cause in test match history.

See also

 New Zealand Māori cricket team
 List of New Zealand cricketers
 List of New Zealand first-class cricket records
 New Zealand national cricket captains
 New Zealand women's cricket team
 Beige Brigade Black Caps Supporters

Notes

References

External links
 

 Cricinfo - New Zealand
 Runs on the board – New Zealand cricket (NZHistory)

Cricket in New Zealand
National cricket teams
Cricket
New Zealand in international cricket
History of cricket by national team